José Manuel Lara (born 21 May 1977) is a Spanish professional golfer.

Lara was born in Valencia, Spain. He turned professional in 1997, and has competed on the European Tour since 2001, having finished 11th in the previous seasons Challenge Tour rankings. From 2003 to 2012, he maintained his tour card by finishing inside the top 115 on the Order of Merit, with a best of 30th place in 2006. However, after a poor 2013 season in which he only made 7 cuts from 29 tour events, he finished 154th on the money list and failed to regain his card at Q-School.

Lara claimed his first European Tour victory at the Hong Kong Open in November 2006. He has featured in the top 100 of the Official World Golf Ranking.

At the 2012 BMW International Open, Lara was disqualified after his caddie tried to hide an illegal 15th club. In 2017, Lara was briefly the caddie for Sergio García. García's regular caddie left temporarily after his wife gave birth.	

Lara is running a golf TV show at Movistar Golf Channel, named Movistar Lara Golf Academy, and is a golf director of A La Roca Golf Academy by Jmlara, at la Roca golf club, close to Barcelóna.

Amateur wins
1996 European Junior Amateur Championship, Spanish International Amateur Championship

Professional wins (6)

European Tour wins (2)

1Co-sanctioned by the Asian Tour

European Tour playoff record (1–0)

Challenge Tour wins (1)

Alps Tour wins (1)

Other wins (2)
2008 Peugeot Loewe Tour de Maioris
2009 Peugeot Loewe Tour Golf Escorpión

Results in major championships

Note: Lara never played in the Masters Tournament or the PGA Championship.

CUT = missed the half-way cut

Results in World Golf Championships

Team appearances
Amateur
Jacques Léglise Trophy (representing the Continent of Europe): 1993, 1994, 1995
European Boys' Team Championship (representing Spain): 1995
European Amateur Team Championship (representing Spain): 1995, 1997 (winners)
European Youths' Team Championship (representing Spain): 1996
Eisenhower Trophy (representing Spain): 1996
St Andrews Trophy (representing the Continent of Europe): 1996

Professional
World Cup (representing Spain): 2007

References

External links

Spanish male golfers
European Tour golfers
Mediterranean Games medalists in golf
Mediterranean Games silver medalists for Spain
Competitors at the 1993 Mediterranean Games
Sportspeople from Valencia
1977 births
Living people
20th-century Spanish people
21st-century Spanish people